Women human rights defenders (WHRDs) are women who defend human rights, and defenders of all genders who defend the rights of women and rights related to gender and sexuality.  Their work and the challenges they face have been recognized by a United Nations (UN) resolution in 2013, which calls for specific protection for women human rights defenders. 

A woman human rights defender can be an Indigenous woman fighting for the rights of her community, a woman advocating against torture, an LGBTQI rights campaigner, a sex workers’ rights collective, or a man fighting for sexual and reproductive rights.

Like other human rights defenders, women human rights defenders can be the target of attacks as they demand the realization of human rights. They face attacks such as discrimination, assault, threats, and violence within their communities.  Women human rights defenders face additional obstacles based on who they are and the specific rights they defend. This means they are targeted just because they are women, LGBTI people or for identifying with their struggles. They also face additional obstacles connected with Institutional discrimination and inequality and because they challenge, or are seen to be challenging, patriarchal power and social norms. They are more at risk of facing gender based violence in the home and the community, and sexist, misogynistic, homophobic, trans-phobic threats, smears and stigmatization, as well as exclusion from resources and power.

International Women Human Rights Defenders Day has been celebrated each 29 November since 2006.

Examples of  contemporary WHRDs 

 Morena Herrera (El Salvador)
 Estela de Carlotto (Argentina)
 Aura Lolita Chavez Ixcaquic (Guatemala)
 Maxima Acuna (Peru)
 Sheyene Gerardi (Venezuela)
 Sonia Pierre (Haiti)
 Su Changlan (China)
 Leila de Lima (Philippines)
 Angkhana Neelapaijit (Thailand)
 Hina Jilani (Pakistan)
 Azza Soliman (Egypt)
 Narges Mohammadi (Iran) 
 Loujain Al-Hathlou (Saudi Arabia)
 Katana Gégé Bukuru (DR Congo)
 Salimata Lam (Mauritania)
 Delphine Djiraibe (Chad)
 Lydia Foy (Ireland)
 Marjan Sax (Netherlands)
  (France/Romania)
 Anna Mokrousova (Ukraine)
Chonthicha Jaengraew (Thailand)
Hortense Louge (Burkina Faso)
Caoimhe Butterly (Ireland)
Geraldine Chacón (Venezuela)
Marfa Rabkova (Belarus)

These are some of the WHRDs killed in recent years, because of their human rights activism

 Berta Cáceres (Honduras)
 Marielle Franco (Brazil)
 Miroslava Breach (Mexico)
 Dr George Tiller (USA)
 Gauri Lankesh (India)
 Xulhaz Mannan (Bangladesh)
 Noxolo Nogwaza (South Africa)
 David Kato (Uganda)
 Natalia Estemirova (Russia)
 Hande Kader (Turkey)
 Salwa Bugaighis (Libya)
 Almaas Elman (Somalia/Canada)

See also List of women killed fighting for human rights.

References

External links 

 Women human rights defenders. UN Office of the High Commissioner for Human Rights
 Women Human Rights Defenders International Coalition (WHRD-IC)
 #Defendher campaign
 Free Viasna Marfa Rabkova